Albert Victor Hodgkinson (10 August 1884 – 25 November 1939) was a Welsh footballer who played as an outside-forward for various clubs in the 1900s, including making one appearance for the Wales national football team in 1908.

Football career
Hodgkinson was born at Pembroke Dock in South Wales, but grew up in Derbyshire. His first professional club was Derby County before he joined Grimsby Town of the Football League Second Division in October 1903. After a season at Blundell Park, in which he made seventeen appearances, scoring five goals, Hodgkinson moved in May 1904 to Devon, where he joined Plymouth Argyle of the Southern League. This was followed by seasons with Leicester Fosse of the Second Division and Bury in the First Division.

In May 1907, Hodgkinson returned to the Southern League when he joined Southampton, along with his Bury teammate John Johnston. Described by the Saints' historians, Holley and Chalk, as "a consistent performer with all his previous clubs", Hodgkinson was "still developing as a dashing outside-left" when he came to Southampton. He made his debut for the Saints on 7 September 1907, when he scored in a 3–2 defeat at home to Crystal Palace. He soon formed useful partnerships with his fellow Welsh forward John Lewis and with George Smith, going on to make 29 appearances in 1907–08, scoring nine goals as Southampton finished the league season in mid-table. He also played in all six FA Cup matches as Saints reached the semi-finals, losing to Wolverhampton Wanderers who went on to take the cup in the final.

The FA Cup Fourth Round tie against Everton played at Goodison Park on Saturday 7 March 1908 was a 0–0 draw. The replay was arranged for the following Tuesday, but was put back by one day to allow Hodgkinson to attend the funeral of his brother, William Henry Hodgkinson, who had died, aged 26, on the Saturday. As a mark of respect, the Saints players wore black armbands. Saints won the replay 3–2, with two goals from "man-of-the-match", Frank Costello.

Hodgkinson is described by Holley & Chalk as "a mercurial player, who would suddenly achieve the sensational only to, just as suddenly, disappear from prominence; he also rarely did what his opponents expected of him."
His reputation grew during his time at The Dell and on 11 April 1908, he played for Wales against Ireland; the match, held at the Athletic Ground, Aberdare ended in a 1–0 victory for the Irish.

He continued with the "Saints" for another season, at the end of which the club finished in third place, with Hodgkinson scoring 11 goals, just behind his fellow forwards Frank Costello on 13 and Arthur Hughes on 15.

In August 1909, Hodgkinson dropped down to non-league football with Croydon Common, followed by spells at Southend United and Ilkeston United.

Life outside and after football
Hodgkinson was also a baseball player of some note, winning two Gold medals at the National Baseball Association's annual tournament.

After he retired from football, he settled in Derbyshire and was the owner of the Rose & Crown Inn at Chellaston near Derby. Following his retirement, the licensee was Tom Keetley who had had a long football career with Doncaster Rovers and Notts County.

Family
Hodgkinson's brother, Bill was a centre-forward with Derby County, playing 16 matches, scoring nine goals in the Football League First Division in the 1903–04 season.

Notes

References

External links
Croydon Common career details

1884 births
1939 deaths
People from Pembroke Dock
Sportspeople from Pembrokeshire
Welsh footballers
Wales international footballers
English Football League players
Southern Football League players
Hinckley Town F.C. players
Derby County F.C. players
Grimsby Town F.C. players
Plymouth Argyle F.C. players
Leicester City F.C. players
Bury F.C. players
Southampton F.C. players
Croydon Common F.C. players
Southend United F.C. players
Association football forwards